Putre is a Chilean town and commune, capital of the Parinacota Province in the Arica-Parinacota Region. The town is backdropped by Taapaca volcanic complex.

Putre is on the edge of the Lauca National Park, and is popular with visitors to the National Park wishing to acclimatise to the altitude.

There is a historical church in Putre.

The commune also includes the localities of  Socoroma, Tignamar, Belén, Chapiquiña, Pachama, Ancuta, Guallatiri, Parinacota, Chucuyo and Caquena.

On March 6, 2011, a 6.2 magnitude earthquake centered  beneath Putre shook northern Chile and southern Peru, causing no injuries and only minor damage.

Climate

According to the Köppen climate classification, Putre has a tundra climate (ET), bordering closely on a cold desert climate (BWk).

Demographics
According to the 2002 census of the National Statistics Institute, Putre had 1,977 inhabitants (1,345 men and 632 women). Of these, 1,235 (62.5%) lived in urban areas and 742 (38.5%) in rural areas. The population fell by 29.5% (826 persons) between the 1992 and 2002 censuses.

Administration
As a commune, Putre is a third-level administrative division of Chile administered by a municipal council, headed by a mayor alcalde who is directly elected every four years.

Within the electoral divisions of Chile, Putre is represented in the Chamber of Deputies by Mr. Nino Baltolu (UDI) and Mr. Orlando Vargas (PPD) as part of the 1st electoral district, which includes the entire Arica and Parinacota Region.The commune is represented in the Senate by Fulvio Rossi Ciocca (PS) and Jaime Orpis Bouchon (UDI) as part of the 1st senatorial constituency (Arica and Parinacota Region and Tarapacá Region).

References

Capitals of Chilean provinces
Communes of Chile
Populated places in Parinacota Province
1580 establishments in the Spanish Empire